Islam Pur Lokari is a small village, situated in the west of Hathi Wind in the Sargodha District of Punjab province, Pakistan. It is included in union council Khan Muhammad Wala. There is a primary school in Islam Pur Lokari.

Populated places in Sargodha District